Glenn Hema Inwood (born 1968) is a right-wing New Zealand public relations specialist and the founder of Omeka Public Relations. His duties with the Wellington-based Omeka include acting as the speaker for the Institute of Cetacean Research, the Japanese organisation that lobbies on behalf of the whaling industry. A Japanese Government audit in 2012 found Japan spent funds intended for reconstruction after the 2011 earthquake and tsunami on other projects including the whaling industry. He has been dubbed "Ginza Glenn" by anti-whaling activists. Glenn also operates Wellington based media company "Spin It Wide" which distributes press releases from Imperial Tobacco.

History
Glenn Hema Inwood is Māori by birth and was raised by a Pākehā family in New Zealand. He studied the Māori language and law at university and subsequently worked as a journalist. Inwood has been a writer and editor for newspapers including Christchurch Star, The Press in Christchurch and the Evening Post in Wellington. He also produced Radio New Zealand's flagship programme Morning Report. Inwood joined the Te Ohu Kai Moana (the Treaty of Waitangi Fisheries Commission) as communications manager in 1999.

In 2000 he won an award from the Public Relations Institute of New Zealand for "Stop The Wall", a campaign on behalf of Waterfront Watch, Wellington.

Press secretary tenure and resignation
Inwood worked as a press secretary for Lianne Dalziel, Immigration Minister in the New Zealand Labour Party government. He also worked simultaneously for Morris Communications on the account of the Treaty of Waitangi Fisheries Commission. In November 2000, the commission hosted the 3rd Annual General Assembly of the World Council of Whalers in Nelson. After Inwood's dual role as a ministerial press adviser and speaker at a pro-whaling conference was raised in parliament, Prime Minister Helen Clark found his "connections with whaling distasteful" and directed Inwood not to attend. On 28 September 2000 Inwood resigned his position as Dalziel's press adviser.

Working for the whalers
Inwood left the Fisheries Commission in 2003 to run his own public relations company, Omeka Public Relations. In March 2003, Inwood organised of a tour of Australasia by the former secretary of the International Whaling Commission, Dr. Ray Gambell, who was urging an end to the moratorium on commercial whaling. The tour was sponsored by the World Council of Whalers. Inwood works as a PR consultant to the Treaty of Waitangi Fisheries Commission and the Institute of Cetacean Research.

Inwood also works for Te Ohu Kaimoana, "the sole voting shareholder in Aotearoa Fisheries, which owns a 50 per cent shareholding in Sealord. The other half-share in Sealord is owned by the Japanese company, Nissui.

Inwood's firm, Omeka, also works for Imperial Tobacco New Zealand, Japan Fisheries Agency, Japan Whaling Association, Species Management Specialists, and the World Council of Whalers.

Inwood is cited as the author in the Portable Document Format properties of a document that iterates alleged actions by the Sea Shepherd Conservation Society against whaling entities internationally.

Spy flights
Inwood, along with another man, chartered several flights out of Albany and Hobart in December 2009 and January 2010. The spy flights were paid for by Omeka Public Relations and attempted to locate the vessels of whaling protesters. Early reports indicated that Inwood posed as a government employee monitoring the ships for search and rescue purposes. While the spy flights were condemned by Australian Prime Minister Julia Gillard and Greg Hunt, charges have not been filed. The incident led to the introduction by Rachel Siewert of a parliamentary bill to ban Japanese whalers from using Australian planes to spy on protesters.

References

External links
Archive of official website of Omeka

1968 births
Living people
New Zealand Māori people
Public relations people